Kottasinghakkarage Nishan Madushka Fernando (born 10 September 1999) is a Sri Lankan cricketer. In April 2018, he was named in Dambulla's squad for the 2018 Super Provincial One Day Tournament. He made his List A debut for Dambulla in the 2018 Super Provincial One Day Tournament on 2 May 2018. Prior to his List A debut, he was named in Sri Lanka's squad for the 2018 Under-19 Cricket World Cup.

In August 2018, he was named in Galle's squad the 2018 SLC T20 League. He made his Twenty20 debut for Galle on 25 August 2018. In December 2018, he was named in Sri Lanka team for the 2018 ACC Emerging Teams Asia Cup. He made his first-class debut for Colts Cricket Club in the 2018–19 Premier League Tournament on 11 January 2019.

In November 2019, he was named in Sri Lanka's squad for the 2019 ACC Emerging Teams Asia Cup in Bangladesh. Later the same month, he was named in Sri Lanka's squad for the men's cricket tournament at the 2019 South Asian Games. The Sri Lanka team won the silver medal, after they lost to Bangladesh by seven wickets in the final.

In October 2020, he was drafted by the Kandy Tuskers for the inaugural edition of the Lanka Premier League. In August 2021, he was named in the SLC Blues team for the 2021 SLC Invitational T20 League tournament. In April 2022, Sri Lanka Cricket (SLC) named him in the Sri Lanka Emerging Team's squad for their tour to England. In the first match of the tour, he scored 269 against Kent, which was the highest first-class score by a Sri Lankan cricketer in England, overtaking Aravinda de Silva who scored 255 for Kent in 1995. In June 2022, he was named in the Sri Lanka A squad for their matches against Australia A during Australia's tour of Sri Lanka.

He is the highest run scorer in Major League Tournament 2022, scoring 1229 runs in 15 innings with highest score of unbeaten 300 runs. 

On 26th January 2023, During warm up match against England Lions, Madushka scored unbeaten 150 and eventually Sri Lanka XI  won the match by 4 wickets.

On 3rd February 2023, first unofficial test match against England Lions, Madushka scored his 10th first class century. He scored 241 runs from 423 balls hitting  25 boundaries and four sixes. Finally the match ended draw. 

On 10th February 2023, second unofficial test match against England Lions, Madushka scored his 11th first class century. He scored 100 runs from 125 deliveries hitting 16 boundaries and one six. Finally the match ended draw.

International career
In February 2023, Madushka was named in Sri Lanka's Test squad for their series against New Zealand. He made his Test debut in the second Test on 17 March 2023.

References

External links
 

1999 births
Living people
Sri Lankan cricketers
Colts Cricket Club cricketers
Sportspeople from Moratuwa
South Asian Games silver medalists for Sri Lanka
South Asian Games medalists in cricket